Waquoit Bay National Estuarine Research Reserve (WBNERR) encompasses open waters, barrier beaches, marshlands and uplands on the south shore of Cape Cod in the towns of Falmouth and Mashpee. The park is managed by the Department of Conservation and Recreation (DCR) and the National Oceanic and Atmospheric Administration.

The WBNERR is representative of the northern section (Cape Cod to Sandy Hook) of the Virginian biogeographic region. WBNERR is located within the transitional border between the Virginian and Acadian biogeographic regions.

Reserve areas
The reserve comprises several individual sites: 
Visitor Center/Headquarters Property  The Visitor's Center is open year round, Monday through Friday, 10 am – 4 pm. Has a short nature trail and runs numerous seasonal education programs.
South Cape Beach State Park, Sage Lot Pond and Flat Pond  This eastern section of the reserve serves has a swimming beach which is a noted surf casting site during the annual bluefish and striped bass migrations.  It is also a nesting ground for protected species such as piping plover and least tern. Sage Lot and Flat Ponds are salt ponds to the east of Waquoit Bay.
Washburn Island  
Quashnet River Property  The river is the largest source of fresh water to the Bay and is mostly surrounded by upland forests. There is a three-mile (5 km) loop trail along the river. Trout Unlimited that has converted a cranberry bog channel back to a river.
North Quashnet Woodlands  Pine woodlands and an abandoned cranberry bog.
Waquoit Bay   Fresh water enters the Bay from four principal sources: the Quashnet/Moonakis River, Red Brook, Childs River, and ground water flow.

The following are salt ponds to the east of Waquoit Bay which are best explored by kayak:
Hamblin Pond, 
Jehu Pond,  
Abigail's Brook

The following freshwater ponds drain to the Waquoit Bay at the northern side and offer kayaking and fishing:
Bog Pond, 
As such it is kept in trust for all citizens and is not privately owned.
Caleb Pond, .
Childs River: Abandoned cranberry bogs and pine woodlands.

History
Artifacts dating back 450–1000 years, including hammer flakes and shell middens, have been found on the Washburn Island. As late as the early 19th century, some Wampanoags still lived around Bourne and Caleb ponds, at a spring supplying fresh water to both settlers and Native Americans.

The administrative, research, and education buildings are located in the historic buildings of the Sargent Estate. Purchased in 1987 by the Commonwealth, great care was given in restoring the buildings. The Quashnet River Property was also purchased in 1987 and incorporated into the Reserve. The Reserve and the Division of Fisheries and Wildlife manage the river property.

Activities and amenities
In addition to interpretive programs, the reserve offers opportunities for hiking, boating, camping, fishing, and restricted hunting.

References

External links

Waquoit Bay National Estuarine Research Reserve
Waquoit Bay National Estuarine Research Reserve Department of Conservation and Recreation

Protected areas of Massachusetts
National Estuarine Research Reserves of the United States
Falmouth, Massachusetts
Protected areas of Barnstable County, Massachusetts
Estuaries of Massachusetts
Estuaries of Barnstable County, Massachusetts
1988 establishments in Massachusetts
Protected areas established in 1988